The Three Best Things in Life is a 1992 Dutch comedy film directed by Ger Poppelaars. It was entered into the 18th Moscow International Film Festival.

Cast
Loes Wouterson	... 	Sacha
Victor Löw	... 	Caspar
Jack Wouterse	... 	Maarten
Pierre Bokma	... 	Ben
Gerard Thoolen	... 	Otto
Gijs Scholten van Aschat	... 	Thomas
Michel van Dousselaere	... 	Jawek
Eric van der Donk	... 	Father
Adrian Brine	... 	Man in Hotel

References

External links 
 

1992 films
1992 comedy films
Dutch comedy films
1990s Dutch-language films